Melaka Planetarium, officially Melaka Planetarium Adventure Science Centre, is a planetarium in Ayer Keroh, Melaka Tengah District, Malacca, Malaysia. It was officiated by Malacca State Chief Minister Mohd Ali Rustam on 10 August 2009, and is the second planetarium in the state after the Al-Khawarizmi Astronomy Complex in Masjid Tanah. The planetarium features Islamic architecture and a landing UFO, costing MYR20 million to be built over an area of 0.7 hectares and 3 floors. It consists of four sections, which are astronomy, outer space, simulation, and physics, and exhibits the magnificent cosmos, history of astronomy and astronomers and also various other attractions.

See also
 List of tourist attractions in Malacca

References

External links

 

2009 establishments in Malaysia
Ayer Keroh
Buildings and structures in Malacca
Planetaria in Malaysia
Tourist attractions in Malacca